Eleusis pallida is a species of unmargined rove beetle in the family Staphylinidae. It is found in North America.

References

Further reading

External links

 

Osoriinae
Articles created by Qbugbot
Beetles described in 1863